Costa Rica made its Paralympic Games début at the 1992 Summer Paralympics in Barcelona, sending just two representatives to compete in men's track and field. Absent in 1996, it returned in 2000, and has participated in every edition of the Summer Paralympics since then. Its delegations have always been small: a single athlete in track and field in 2000; a single swimmer in 2004; two table tennis players in 2008, a single athlete in track and field and a cyclist on 2012.

Sherman Guity is the first medalist for Costa Rica at the Paralympics. He won the silver medal in the men's 100 metres T64 event at the 2020 Summer Paralympics held in Tokyo, Japan. A few days later, he also won the gold medal in the men's 200 metres T64 event.

Costa Rica has never taken part in the Winter Paralympics.

See also
 Costa Rica at the Olympics

References